Şiləvəngə (also, Shilavegyakh, Shilavengya, and Shilyavyangya) is a village and municipality in the Jalilabad Rayon of Azerbaijan.  It has a population of 1,068.

Notable natives 

 Faig Jafarov — National Hero of Azerbaijan.

References 

Populated places in Jalilabad District (Azerbaijan)